Foster Hall, also known as Melodeon Hall, is located on the campus of Park Tudor School at 7200 N. College Ave. in Indianapolis, Indiana. The Tudor Revival style building was designed by Robert Frost Daggett and built in 1927.  It is a -story, stone building with a steeply pitched slate gable roof with seven gables.  It features leaded glass windows and sits on a raise basement.  It was built for Josiah K. Lilly, Sr. (1861-1948) to house his collection of Stephen Foster materials and serves the community as a reception, concert, and meeting facility.

It was added to the National Register of Historic Places in 2005.

References

School buildings on the National Register of Historic Places in Indiana
Tudor Revival architecture in Indiana
School buildings completed in 1927
Butler University
Buildings and structures in Indianapolis
National Register of Historic Places in Indianapolis
1927 establishments in Indiana